International Chess Day is celebrated annually on 20 July, the day the International Chess Federation (FIDE) was founded, in 1924.

The idea to celebrate this day as the international chess day was proposed by UNESCO, and it has been celebrated as such since 1966, after it was established by FIDE. FIDE, which has 181 chess federations as its members, organizes chess events and competitions around the world on this day. As recently as 2013, the international chess day was celebrated in 178 countries, according to FIDE President Kirsan Ilyumzhinov.  On 12 December, 2019, the UN General Assembly unanimously approved a resolution recognizing the day.

The day is celebrated by many of the 605 million regular chess players around the world. A 2012 Yougov poll showed that "a surprisingly stable 70% of the adult population has played chess at some point during their lives". This number holds at approximately the same level in countries as diverse as the US, UK, Germany, Russia, and India.

See also

References

External links 
International Chess Day website

Chess
July observances
1966 in chess